Mukunda Hari Shrestha (born 14 December 1955) is a Nepalese long-distance runner. He competed in the marathon at the 1980 Summer Olympics.

He also took part in the 7th, 8th and 9th Asian games, however he did not win any medals. In the Bangkok marathon, he finished in third place.

References

External links
 

1955 births
Living people
Athletes (track and field) at the 1980 Summer Olympics
Nepalese male long-distance runners
Nepalese male marathon runners
Olympic athletes of Nepal
Place of birth missing (living people)
20th-century Nepalese people